"Patience" is a song by American rock band Guns N' Roses from their second studio album, G N' R Lies (1988), released as a single in April 1989. The song peaked at number four on the US Billboard Hot 100. The song is a ballad, played using three acoustic guitars and was recorded in a single session by producer Mike Clink. A music video of the song was shot and appears on the band's music video DVD, Welcome to the Videos.

The motivation for the track is generally accepted to be the troublesome relationship between Axl Rose and his now ex-wife Erin Everly, though this was never stated in the album or interviews. According to bass guitarist Duff McKagan, "Axl came up with a great lyric, seemingly out of nowhere, that of course became the story and melody of that song."

Steven Adler did not record on the track, although in some live performances prior to release of the album, such as their performance at the Orange County Fair in New York in the summer of 1988, percussion (and electric instruments) were used.

Music video
In the video, the band members are situated in a hotel where they are the only constant images, as all other people are present for a moment, then fade away. Directed by Nigel Dick, it was one of the numerous videos produced by the band. The video was filmed on Valentine's Day during 1989, some scenes being shot at the Record Plant. It was the last video in which Steven Adler appeared (even though he did not play on the recorded track) and the last before the Use Your Illusion videos. Mike Clink is also featured in the video, sitting at the mixing board. The video was shot in The Ambassador Hotel, made famous due to Bobby Kennedy's assassination in 1968. The hotel was inoperative and scheduled for demolition, but was not demolished until 2006.

Legacy and covers
The song is considered a classic hair metal ballad.

Rock musician Chris Cornell recorded a cover of the song, which was released posthumously on July 20, 2020.

Live performances
"Patience" has been a staple in Guns N' Roses' setlists on all tours since the song was released. When performed live, electric guitars are often used instead of acoustic. Despite the album version of the song featuring no drumming, the drummers make active use of their drum kits during performances, and keyboardist Dizzy Reed makes use of his keyboard as well. In the 21st century, the band's lead guitarist (Slash) would play electric guitar, while the second guitarist (Buckethead, Paul Tobias, Richard Fortus, Bumblefoot or Duff McKagan) would play acoustic. Live performances are available on Appetite for Democracy 3D and Made in Stoke 24/7/11.

The band performed the song live at the American Music Awards filmed at the Shrine Auditorium.  Steven Adler was in rehab at the time of filming, and Don Henley filled in for him during the taping.

Track listings

Personnel
 W. Axl Rose – lead vocals, whistling
 Slash – lead acoustic guitar, backing vocals
 Izzy Stradlin – rhythm acoustic guitar, backing vocals
 Duff McKagan – rhythm acoustic guitar, backing vocals

Charts

Weekly charts

Chris Cornell cover

Year-end charts

Chris Cornell cover

Certifications

Release history

See also
 List of glam metal albums and songs

References

1980s ballads
1989 singles
Guns N' Roses songs
Music videos directed by Nigel Dick
Songs written by Izzy Stradlin
1988 songs
Geffen Records singles
American folk rock songs
Glam metal ballads